The 1876 United States presidential election in Maryland took place on November 7, 1876, as part of the 1876 United States presidential election. Maryland voters chose eight representatives, or electors, to the Electoral College, who voted for president and vice president.

Maryland was won by Samuel J. Tilden, the former governor of New York (D–New York), running with Thomas A. Hendricks, the governor of Indiana and future vice president, with 56.05% of the popular vote, against Rutherford B. Hayes, the governor of Ohio (R-Ohio), running with Representative William A. Wheeler, with 43.95% of the vote.

Notably, this is the closest any Democrat has come to winning the solidly Republican Garrett County since it was first formed in 1872. This is also the first Presidential election that Garrett County was able to vote in, as it was formed on November 4, 1872.

Results

Results by county

See also
 United States presidential elections in Maryland
 1876 United States presidential election
 1876 United States elections

Notes

References 

Maryland
1876
Presidential